Génération sans futur (French: Generation without a future) is the third album by Art Zoyd, released in 1980 through Atem Records. In 1992, Génération sans futur would be reissued as a double compact disc with Symphonie pour le jour où brûleront les cités, Musique pour l'Odyssée and Archives 1.

Track listing

Personnel 
Art Zoyd
Patricia Dallio – piano
Alain Eckert – guitar
Gérard Hourbette – violin, viola
Gilles Renard – saxophone
Jean-Pierre Soarez – trumpet
Thierry Zaboitzeff – cello, bass guitar, vocals
Production and additional personnel
Art Zoyd – production
Patrice Jean Baptiste – illustrations
Etienne Conod – mixing, recording
Daniel Denis – percussion on "Génération sans futur"
Carole Grave – photography
Gérard Nguyen – production

References

External links 
 

1980 albums
Art Zoyd albums